The Bundestag Science Prize (in German: Wissenschaftspreis des Deutschen Bundestages) is a German science prize. It awards €10,000 every two years for outstanding work about parliamentarism. The prize donor is the German Bundestag.

Recipients

References 

Political science awards
German science and technology awards
Bundestag